In mathematics, an aperiodic semigroup is a semigroup S such that every element x ∈ S is aperiodic, that is, for each x there exists a positive integer n such that xn = xn + 1.  An aperiodic monoid is an aperiodic semigroup which is a monoid.

Finite aperiodic semigroups 
A finite semigroup is aperiodic if and only if it contains no nontrivial subgroups, so a synonym used (only?) in such contexts is group-free semigroup. In terms of Green's relations, a finite semigroup is aperiodic if and only if its H-relation is trivial. These two characterizations extend to group-bound semigroups.

A celebrated result of algebraic automata theory due to Marcel-Paul Schützenberger asserts that a language is star-free if and only if its syntactic monoid is finite and aperiodic.

A consequence of the Krohn–Rhodes theorem is that every finite aperiodic monoid divides a wreath product of copies of the three-element flip-flop monoid, consisting of an identity element and two right zeros.  The two-sided Krohn–Rhodes theorem alternatively characterizes finite aperiodic monoids as divisors of iterated block products of copies of the two-element semilattice.

See also
Monogenic semigroup
Special classes of semigroups

References

 

Semigroup theory